The Posting of the Colors is a practice conducted by military color guards of the United States at the beginning of a particular ceremony. The practice is also done by the Boy Scouts of America. Posting the colors requires that a color guard team move the colors (usually the American flag, the state flag, the service flag, and the unit flag) from a carried position and placed into a stand. This formality is normally done at events such as graduation ceremonies and public events. Specifically, it is done prior to the playing of "The Star-Spangled Banner" or the reciting of the Pledge of Allegiance. In that case, the color guard will present arms once the colors have been posted.

See also
 Military colours, standards and guidons
 Presentation of Colours
 Casing of the Colors

References

United States military traditions
United States Army traditions
Ceremonies
Boy Scouts of America
Police culture